The 2000–01 Atlanta Thrashers season was the team's second season of competition in the National Hockey League (NHL). The Thrashers finished fourth in the Southeast Division and failed to qualify for the playoffs for the second consecutive season.

Offseason

Regular season

The Thrashers struggled on the penalty kill during the regular season, allowing a league-high 90 power-play goals, and finishing 30th overall in penalty-kill percentage, at 77.94%.

Final standings

Schedule and results

Player statistics

Regular season
Scoring

Goaltending

Note: GP = Games played; G = Goals; A = Assists; Pts = Points; +/- = Plus/minus; PIM = Penalty minutes; PPG=Power-play goals; SHG=Short-handed goals; GWG=Game-winning goals
      MIN=Minutes played; W = Wins; L = Losses; T/OT = Ties/Overtime Losses; GA = Goals against; GAA = Goals against average; SO = Shutouts; SA=Shots against; SV=Shots saved; SV% = Save percentage;

Awards and records
None

Transactions
The Thrashers were involved in the following transactions during the 2000–01 season.

Trades

Free agents signed

Free Agents Lost

Waivers Claims

Draft picks
Atlanta's draft picks at the 2000 NHL Entry Draft held at the Pengrowth Saddledome in Calgary, Alberta.

References

Atlanta Thrashers seasons
Atlanta Thrashers
Atlanta Thrashers